Zeeshan Khan (born 5 September 1997) is a Pakistani male squash player. He achieved his highest career ranking of 192 in March 2018 during the  2018 PSA World Tour.

References 

1997 births
Living people
Pakistani male squash players
Sportspeople from Peshawar
Racket sportspeople from Peshawar
20th-century Pakistani people
21st-century Pakistani people